DDU, Ddu, DdU, D.D.U., or D.D.U may refer to:
 Dharmsinh Desai University, Nadiad, India
Deen Dayal Upadhyaya Hospital, Shimla, India
 Dumont d'Urville Station, a French scientific station in Antarctica
 Dymaxion Deployment Unit, a temporary housing unit designed by R. Buckminster Fuller for the United States Army in 1940
 Delivered Duty Unpaid, an international commercial term; see Incoterm
 DDU: District Detective Unit, an Irish police procedural drama from RTÉ
 Drug Dependency Unit, a special centre in the UK where drug addicts are treated, see Brain Committee for first use
 Pt. Deen Dayal Upadhyaya Junction, station code: DDU
 Display Driver Uninstaller, a popular GPU driver removal tool for Nvidia and AMD graphics cards

See also
 "Ddu-Du Ddu-Du", 2018 song by K-pop group Blackpink